Puncta extraordinaria, or extraordinary points, refer to certain small dots in the Masoretic Text of the Hebrew Bible, where they appear alongside other, more common, traditional markings (nequddot) found in the Masoretic Text. There are fifteen places in the Masoretic Text where the puncta extraordinaria appear. Ten of the fifteen instances are in the Pentateuch. The dots may appear above or below (usually above) individual letters or even an entire word or group of words.

These points have also been referred to as cancellation dots, and their use is derived from similar practices by Greek scribes. It is commonly believed that they were intended to indicate places where there is doubt about whether the indicated words or features of their spelling are authentic. Similar dots are found in manuscripts of the Dead Sea Scrolls, where they indicated that a word was inserted in error and should not be included in any potential copies of the scroll.  The existence of these dots is attested to as early as the Mishna.

The existence of the puncta extraordinaria is relevant to reconstructing the history of the Masoretic Text. Because all Masoretic manuscripts contain these points in the same places, as well as agreement in a large number of other minor details, Paul de Lagarde (1863) proposed that they were all copied from a single original manuscript. This theory, known as the Urtext theory, has met with the approval of "many scholars."

List of puncta 

The list below is from Romain Butin's The Ten Nequdoth of the Torah.

References

Language of the Hebrew Bible